The Klimov VK-3 was the first Soviet afterburning bypass turbojet engine. Designed by S V Lyunevich at Klimov, at OKB-117 in 1949, this engine first ran in 1952, and was qualified at  thrust (dry) and  thrust (with afterburner) in 1954. The VK-3 was developed for the Mikoyan-Gurevich I-3 (I-380) and I-3U/I-5 (I-410) fighters.  First flown in the I-3U in July 1956, the engine's performances was good but its reliability was poor. Even after modifications in December 1956 when newly designed compressor blades were installed, developmental problems continued, the program was ultimately canceled in January 1958. The engine was superseded by the Lyulka AL-7F, a less modern but more efficient engine.

Design
The VK-3 is a single-shaft turbofan engine with a 10-stage axial compressor, an annular combustion chamber, a three-stage turbine, an afterburner and a variable supersonic nozzle. Bypass air is drawn from the second stage of the compressor to 12 external pipes and is directed into the turbine through an adjustable mixing valve, bypassing the combustion chamber. The 8th stage compressor has two position adjustable guide vanes.

Applications
 Mikoyan-Gurevich I-3
 Mikoyan-Gurevich I-5

Specifications

See also

References

External links

1950s turbofan engines
Low-bypass turbofan engines
Klimov aircraft engines